Rose Marie Toussaint is a practicing Black woman liver transplant surgeon in the United States.

Early life 
Toussaint was born in Haiti and moved to Miami in 1970. Her goal of becoming a physician at this young age was evident by her serious study of math and science coursework. She was awarded her Bachelor of Science degree in Biology from Loyola University in 1978. Furthering her education, in 1983 she received her Doctorate in Medicine from Howard University.

She wrote an autobiography, Never Question the Miracle: A Surgeon’s Story, in which she describes the prediction of a Vodun priest who predicted she would be a doctor when she grew up. As founder of the National Transplant Foundation Inc. she works with those that need assistance to defray the cost of organ transplants. Rose Marie Toussaint is also the founder of the American National Transplant Foundation Inc. and surgeon.

Howard University 
While graduating from Howard University in 1983, she also maintained high honors within the program. Following her schooling she interned at the Howard University Hospital. Toussaint then became the chief surgeon at Howard University for the liver transplant center. Prior to this, she trained under Thomas Starzl at the University of Pittsburgh Medical School for three years. Starzl also has more liver transplants than anyone else in the world. In 1997, she left Howard University Hospital.

Professional career 
Toussaint is now the only practicing Black woman liver transplant surgeon in the United States. Toussaint is highly regarded by her co-workers. She is a well practiced liver surgeon, shown here  by her accomplishments. She is even commended by Dr. Clive Callender, the Howard University Medical Center Director. She is highly regarded as a "seven-day-a-week professional," and often visits patients in-between.

Organ Donation / Transplantation 
Toussaint very quickly became a strong advocate for those who donate organs. Her patients often weren't able to kept alive long enough to see a liver or kidney transplant. She speaks on this sad reality of the shortage of donators... "Twelve patients die [nationwide] every day waiting for an organ," said Toussaint, who lives in North Laurel with her husband, Michael. "This is not acceptable. I want to do something to change this.". After some consideration she decided to found the National Transplant Foundation to increase overall donation size.

References

Haitian emigrants to the United States
American transplant surgeons
Haitian women
Howard University alumni
Women surgeons